Whitfield Railway station was the terminus railway station for the Whitfield railway line. It was opened in 1899 and closed in 1953. It was the most distant narrow gauge railway station from Melbourne in Victoria.

Infrastructure
The station had a moderately long passenger platform, small goods yard, goods shed, ticket office and locomotive shed.

References

Rail transport in Victoria (Australia)